Gheorghe Mulțescu (born 13 November 1951) is a Romanian professional football manager and a former football player.

Club career
Gheorghe Mulțescu made his Divizia A debut playing for Jiul Petroșani in a 0–0 against Crișul Oradea. He played 8 seasons in his first period spent at Jiul Petroșani, gaining a total of 239 Divizia A appearances in which he scored 74 goals, also he scored two goals in the 4–2 victory against Politehnica Timișoara in the 1974 Cupa României final, helping Jiul win the first trophy in the club's history and played two games in the 1974–75 European Cup Winners' Cup. Mulțescu was transferred at Dinamo București in 1979, spending six seasons with The Red Dogs, winning three consecutive Divizia A titles from 1982 until 1984, at the first he contributed with 9 goals scored in 26 matches, in the second he played 31 games and scored 6 goals and in the third he made 23 appearances and scored 8 goals, also winning two cups and playing 20 games with 9 goals scored in European competitions, managing to reach the semi-finals in the 1983–84 European Cup campaign in which he contributed with 3 goals scored in 7 matches. In 1985 Mulțescu returned to Jiul Petroșani, this time as a player-coach, managing to promote the team from Divizia B to Divizia A. He spent his last season as a player in Divizia A at CSM Suceava, scoring 2 goals in 9 matches, which brought him to a total of 407 matches played and 111 goals scored in Divizia A. He ended his career playing in Divizia B for Autobuzul București and UTA Arad.

Mulțescu won the Universiade gold medal with Romania's students football team in the 1974 edition that was held in France, playing alongside László Bölöni, Dan Păltinișanu, Romulus Chihaia and Paul Cazan.

International career
Gheorghe Mulțescu played 12 matches and scored 2 goals for Romania (16/3 including Romania's Olympic team games), making his debut on 25 September 1974 under coach Valentin Stănescu in a friendly which ended 0–0 against Bulgaria.
He played another two games in which he scored one goal against Bulgaria, a 1–0 away loss and a 3–2 home victory in the 1973–76 Balkan Cup lost final. He played two games and scored one goal in a 2–0 victory against Cyprus at the Euro 1980 qualifiers. Mulțescu's last game for the national team was a 1–0 away victory against Cyprus at the successful Euro 1984 qualifiers.

International goals
Scores and results list Romania's goal tally first, score column indicates score after each Mulțescu goal.

Managerial career
Gheorghe Mulțescu managed several clubs, most of them being from Romania, where he was nicknamed Smurdul after the Romanian emergency rescue service, because of his capacity of taking charge of teams who are going through a difficult time in mid-season and taking them on a points-winning path, especially those who are fighting to avoid relegation. He coached 13 teams in Divizia A, at some of them having several terms, at Dinamo he was coach on five periods, having a total of 313 Divizia A matches (112 victories, 74 draws, 127 losses). He also coached outside of Romania, in Turkey and Saudi Arabia, his most successful period being in his first term at Samsunspor from 1993 until 1997, a period in which he finished one championship in the 5th place and won his only trophy from his managerial career, the 1993–94 Balkans Cup.

Personal life
His son, Cătălin Mulțescu, was a goalkeeper, playing at various Liga I and Liga II clubs through his career. After he retired from the professional football career, he became a goalkeeping coach.

Honours

Player
Jiul Petroșani
Divizia B: 1985–86
Cupa României: 1973–74
Dinamo București
Divizia A: 1981–82, 1982–83, 1983–84
Cupa României: 1981–82, 1983–84

Manager
Samsunspor
Balkans Cup: 1993–94

Notes

References

External links
 

1951 births
Living people
Romanian footballers
Olympic footballers of Romania
Romania international footballers
Liga I players
Liga II players
AFC Rocar București players
Romanian football managers
FC Universitatea Cluj managers
CSM Jiul Petroșani managers
FC Politehnica Timișoara managers
FC Dinamo București players
CSM Jiul Petroșani players
FC UTA Arad players
Romanian expatriate sportspeople in Turkey
Süper Lig managers
Samsunspor managers
MKE Ankaragücü managers
Adanaspor managers
Kayserispor managers
Gaziantepspor managers
FC Dinamo București managers
AFC Dacia Unirea Brăila managers
FC Astra Giurgiu managers
FC Brașov (1936) managers
FC Vaslui managers
Romanian expatriate football managers
Expatriate football managers in Turkey
Expatriate football managers in Saudi Arabia
Al-Taawoun FC managers
CSM Ceahlăul Piatra Neamț managers
FC Petrolul Ploiești managers
FC Sportul Studențesc București managers
FC Progresul București managers
CS Gaz Metan Mediaș managers
Ettifaq FC managers
FC Voluntari managers
CS Universitatea Craiova managers
Association football midfielders